Milton Spinoza Plesset (7 February 1908 – 19 February 1991) was an American applied physicist who worked in the field of fluid mechanics and nuclear energy. He was elected to the National Academy of Engineering in 1979 for his fundamental contributions to multiphase flows, bubble dynamics, and safety of nuclear reactors. Plesset served as Professor of Engineering Science at California Institute of Technology during 1951 to 1978. Notable scientists Andrea Prosperetti and Norman Zabusky finished their doctoral work under Plesset's guidance.

He with Christian Møller are known for the Møller–Plesset perturbation theory.
The Rayleigh-Plesset equation describing the dynamics of a bubble in an infinite body of fluid is also named after him.

Education and work
Born in Pittsburgh, Pennsylvania, Plesset received his bachelor's degree from University of Pittsburgh in 1929 and a Ph.D. from Yale University in 1932. Soon after his Ph.D. Plesset joined Caltech and worked with Robert Oppenheimer. Together, they undertook a theoretical study of positrons using the Dirac equation in quantum electrodynamics to show how electron-positron pairs were formed.

References

External links

1908 births
1991 deaths
20th-century American physicists
20th-century American engineers
University of Pittsburgh alumni
Yale University alumni
California Institute of Technology faculty
Fluid dynamicists
University of Rochester faculty
Members of the United States National Academy of Engineering
Fellows of the American Physical Society